Huși is a city in Romania.

Husi may also refer to:

 Huși, a village in Preutești Commune, Suceava County, Romania
 Huși, a small river in the city Huși, Romania
 Hospital Universitario San Ignacio (HUSI), a hospital in Bogotá, Colombia
 Huxi, Penghu, a city in the Pescadores Islands in Taiwan also spelled Husi